Black Country, New Road (commonly abbreviated to BCNR or BC,NR) are an English rock band formed in Cambridgeshire in 2018, consisting of Tyler Hyde (vocals, bass), Lewis Evans (vocals, flute, saxophone), May Kershaw (vocals, keys), Georgia Ellery (violin, backing vocals), Charlie Wayne (drums, backing vocals) and Luke Mark (guitar, backing vocals). The band's first two albums featured guitarist and lead vocalist Isaac Wood, who left the band in 2022.

The band gained initial attention through debut singles "Athens, France" and "Sunglasses" in 2019, which combined features of experimental rock, post-punk and post-rock, drawing comparisons to bands such as Slint and contemporaries Black Midi. Their debut album For the First Time, released in 2021, received widespread critical acclaim, was nominated for the Mercury Prize and reached No. 4 on the UK Albums Chart. Four days before the release of their 2022 second album Ants from Up There, Wood left the band, citing mental health struggles. The album received further critical acclaim and commercial success, debuting at No. 3 on the UK Albums Chart.

Following the departure of Wood, the band immediately began work on new material, with Hyde, Evans and Kershaw sharing lead vocal duties. After touring throughout 2022, the band released the concert film, Live at Bush Hall, in February 2023, featuring their new songs.

History

2018–2021: Early career and For the First Time

Hyde, Evans, Ellery, Kershaw, Wayne and former vocalist/guitarist Isaac Wood, along with Connor Browne and Jonny Pyke, were members of Nervous Conditions, a Cambridge, UK-based band with dual drums and a similar, but more improvised sound, to Black Country, New Road. They formed in 2015 and recorded a full-length album in 2017, provisionally titled Zak's Anniversary. The album was shelved and remains officially unreleased. Following multiple allegations of sexual assault against Browne, Nervous Conditions split in early 2018.

The ensemble, without Browne and Pyke, reconvened soon after as Black Country, New Road, a six-piece named after a road in the West Midlands in England, which they came up with after utilising Wikipedia's 'random article' button. They performed several live shows and gained a small level of notoriety in the underground scene in London. Their debut single, "Athen's, France", released on 18 January 2019, and was pressed on a limited run of 250 7-inch singles via Speedy Wunderground.

Black Country, New Road gained its seventh member, Luke Mark, between the release of "Athens, France" and their second single, "Sunglasses". This second single released on 25 July 2019, via Blank Editions, and had three different 7-inch pressings: the first was limited to 500 copies and had a unique picture assembled onto the cover by the band themselves, the second limited to 250 with the cover art featuring a marching band, and the third with an unknown number of copies and a picture of the band assembling the first pressing. The single gained the attention and acclaim of many critics; Stereogum noted the wide variety of genre influences on the track, describing it as a "wild ride", and John Doran of The Quietus lauded the group on the back of "Sunglasses" as the "best in the entire world".

On 28 October 2020, Black Country, New Road signed to Ninja Tune and announced their debut album, For the First Time, which was released on 5 February 2021. This announcement was backed by their third single, "Science Fair", which has no physical release outside of For the First Time. Their fourth single, "Track X", was released on 11 January 2021.

2021–2022: Ants from Up There and Isaac Wood's departure

On 12 October 2021, the band announced their second album Ants from Up There and released its lead single "Chaos Space Marine". Four of the album's songs were released as singles: "Chaos Space Marine", "Bread Song" on 2 November 2021, "Concorde" on 30 November 2021 and "Snow Globes" on 19 January 2022.

On 3 November 2021, Black Country, New Road cancelled their upcoming European tour due to a band member's illness. The band released the Never Again EP on 3 December, a Rough Trade Records exclusive limited to 1,500 copies which features covers of songs by MGMT, ABBA and Adele.

On 31 January 2022, lead vocalist and guitarist Isaac Wood announced his sudden departure from the band four days before the release of Ants From Up There via the band's Instagram, citing struggles with his mental health. This resulted in the cancelling of the band's planned first United States tour. Black Country, New Road announced that the remaining six members had already began to work on new music without Wood, as they were aware of Wood's planned exit long before it was announced. Out of respect for Wood, the band will not play any music from the first two albums live but will open the door for Wood to return in the future if he chooses to. Immediately prior to Wood's departure, Tyler Hyde noted that the band's next release might not take the form of a studio album: "I know it's not going to be an album in its normal form. It would be cool to work with an orchestra; it would be cool to do a film score. These are just some of the ideas we're bouncing around at the moment." Bassist Tyler Hyde had initially planned to become the band's new lead vocalist, with the option to share the duty with other members.

Ants from Up There was released on 4 February 2022 to universal critical acclaim. It also debuted at No. 3 on the UK Albums Chart, the band's highest placement yet.

2022-present: Future works

With Wood no longer a member, the band scheduled and announced a European tour in summer 2022, as well as an American tour supporting Black Midi. The band performed new, unreleased songs throughout their 2022 concerts, which Lewis Evans said was written specifically to give the band material to tour with and may not appear on the upcoming third album.

On 14 November 2022, the band released a second EP of covers titled Never Again Pt. 2, to celebrate the band's placement on Rough Trade's album of the year list. The EP was limited to 1,500 copies and features covers of songs by Regina Spektor, Caroline Polachek, The Magnetic Fields, and Billie Eilish.

On 14 February 2023, the band posted a video on social media containing a teaser for something "coming soon" for release on 20 February. It was then announced to be Live at Bush Hall, a recording of their performances at Bush Hall, London. This 52-minute video was recorded over two days and was composed entirely of unreleased material that the band had debuted at concerts in 2022, and marks the band's first release of new music since Wood's departure.

Musical style and influences 
Black Country, New Road has been described as a centerpiece of a new scene of British rock bands rooted in experimental post-punk with sprechgesang – or "talk-singing" – vocals, alongside contemporaries Black Midi, Squid, Dry Cleaning, Shame, Yard Act and Irish band Fontaines D.C. The band often references other musicians in their songs, such as jokingly referring to themselves as "the world’s second-best Slint tribute act" in the song "Science Fair". "Track X" references the band's relationship with Black Midi. "Sunglasses," meanwhile, features the line "leave Kanye out of this", and "The Place Where He Inserted the Blade" references West's song "Bound 2". "Chaos Space Marine" and "Good Will Hunting" describe a girl with "Billie Eilish style". "Athens, France" – as it appears on For the First Time – contains lyrics from Phoebe Bridgers' "Motion Sickness"; the original single also references Ariana Grande's "Thank U, Next".

The band's debut album For the First Time is rooted in post-punk, post-rock, indie rock and klezmer.  Their instrumentation also draws from American composer Steve Reich and jazz musician Ornette Coleman. Wood's vocals were compared to Slint frontman Brian McMahan and The Fall lead singer Mark E. Smith; his lyrics were influenced by American singer-songwriter Father John Misty, with Wood declaring "he's not the best lyricist in the world, but what he is is entirely, entirely honest."

Their second album Ants From Up There was written to feature a more accessible sound. It has been described as post-rock, chamber pop and art rock. The band became "obsessed" with Canadian indie rock band Arcade Fire during the United Kingdom's COVID-19 lockdown; several critics have compared songs such as "Chaos Space Marine" and "The Place Where He Inserted the Blade" to Arcade Fire. Black Country, New Road also recalled listening to Kurt Vile and Frank Ocean for inspiration during the writing process.

Other projects

The band regularly performs live with experimental rock group Black Midi, touring collectively as Black Midi, New Road. Geordie Greep of Black Midi said the following: “If there's another band who are really good in the same city, who you also really get on with, there's no reason not to get together and do something proper. It's just making sure you don't do it for the sake of it and you have a solid reason for doing it.”

The band collaborated with fellow London musician Ethan P. Flynn on a released live version of his song "Television Show".

Violinist Georgia Ellery is one half of the experimental electronic duo Jockstrap, who have released 2 EPs under Warp Records. She also collaborated with Jamie xx on a BBC Radio 3 session on 30 May 2020. She made her acting debut in 2019's Bait, which won a BAFTA award for Outstanding Debut by a British Writer, Director or Producer. Ellery has performed and recorded as a member of conservatory folk trio Contours and Happy Beigel Klezmer Orkester, a six-piece Klezmer band formed during studies at Guildhall School of Music and Drama.

Bassist Tyler Hyde is the daughter of Underworld founder Karl Hyde. She also performs solo as 'Tyler Cryde'.

Drummer Charlie Wayne was also a drummer of another British band, Ugly. Saxophonist Lewis Evans has performed and recorded as a member of 3-piece experimental ensemble 'Guildhall Military Orchestra'.  He also made a self-titled album under the alias Good With Parents and featured on the TRAAMS single "The Greyhound".

Former lead singer Isaac Wood has released singles and made a collaboration EP with James Martin, titled Good Dog vs. Bad Dog, under his alias The Guest.

Members
Current members
 Tyler Hyde – bass guitar (2018–present), backing vocals (2018–2022), lead vocals (2022–present)
 Lewis Evans – saxophone (2018–present), flute (2022–present), lead vocals (2022–present)
 Georgia Ellery – violin (2018–present), backing vocals (2022–present)
 May Kershaw – keyboards (2018–present), backing vocals (2018–2022), accordion (2022-present), lead vocals (2022–present)
 Charlie Wayne – drums (2018–present), backing vocals (2022–present)
 Luke Mark – guitar (2019–present), backing vocals (2022–present)

Former members
 Isaac Wood – lead vocals, guitar (2018–2022)

Touring musicians
 Nina Lim – violin (2021–present; serves as substitute for Ellery while she is touring with Jockstrap)

Timeline

Discography

Albums

Extended plays

Singles

Live albums

Music videos

Awards and nominations

References

English post-rock groups
Musical groups from London
Musical groups established in 2018
2018 establishments in England